James, Jim or Jimmy McDougall or MacDougall may refer to:

 James McDougall (explorer), 19th century explorer of British Columbia
 James A. McDougall (1817–1867), American politician from California
 James Dunlop MacDougall (1891–1963), Scottish political activist
 Jimmy McDougall (footballer) (1904–1984), Scottish footballer (Partick Thistle, Liverpool FC and Scotland)
 James J. McDougall (born 1925), Canadian geologist, see Canadian Mining Hall of Fame
 Jim McDougal (1940–1998), political and business associate of Bill and Hillary Clinton
 Jimmy McDougall, Scottish Procurator Fiscal, responsible for investigating the crash of Pan Am Flight 103
 James MacDougall (born 1944), Canadian field hockey player
 James McDougall (academic) (born 1974), British historian and Oxford academic